Morita (written: 森田 or 盛田) is a Japanese surname. Notable people with the  surname include:

, co-founder of the Sony Corporation
, Japanese tennis player
, Japanese psych folk singer-songwriter
, former commissioner of Nippon Professional Baseball
, Japanese footballer
, Japanese animation director
, Japanese pole vaulter
June Morita, American statistics educator
, Japanese volleyball player
, Japanese long-distance runner
, Japanese mathematician
Koichi Morita (army officer)
, Japanese composer and singer
, Japanese footballer
, Japanese rugby union footballer
, Tatenokai member
, Japanese actor
, also known as Morita Shoma, founder of Morita Therapy
, Japanese Go player
Pat Morita, or Noriyuki Morita, Japanese-American actor
, Japanese long-distance runner
, Japanese author
, Japanese actress
, Japanese essayist and legislator
, Japanese swimmer
, Japanese interior designer
, Japanese film director

Fictional characters 
Gwen Morita, Magic Girl Alchemical Earth in the webcomic Sleepless Domain
Jim Morita, soldier in the Howling Commandos from Marvel Comics
Yukari Morita, the protagonist of Rocket Girls

Japanese-language surnames